Jason Stoltenberg was the defending champion, but lost in the second round this year.

Thomas Enqvist won the title, defeating Javier Frana 6–3, 3–6, 6–3 in the final.

Seeds
A champion seed is indicated in bold text while text in italics indicates the round in which that seed was eliminated.

  Magnus Larsson (semifinals)
  Thomas Enqvist (champion)
  Jason Stoltenberg (second round)
  David Wheaton (semifinals)
 N/A
  Mark Woodforde (first round)
  Chuck Adams (first round)
  Jared Palmer (quarterfinals)

Draw

External links
 Singles draw

Singles